Pitraea is a monotypic genus of flowering plants belonging to the family Verbenaceae. It only contains one known species, Pitraea cuneato-ovata (Cav.) Caro

Its native range is southern South America. It is found in (north-eastern and north-western) Argentina, Bolivia, Brazil, (central and northern) Chile and Peru.

The genus name of Pitraea is in honour of Adolf Samoilovich Pitra (1830–1889), a Russian professor of botany in Kharkiv.
The genus has 2 known synonyms; Castelia  and Phelloderma .
The Latin specific epithet of cuneato-ovata is derived from cuneate meaning wedge-shaped and ovate from ovum meaning. The genus was first described and published in Bull. Soc. Imp. Naturalistes Moscou Vol.35 (II) on page 328 in 1862. Then the species was published in Kurtziana Vol.1 on page 274 in 1961.

References

Verbenaceae
Verbenaceae genera
Plants described in 1862
Flora of Bolivia
Flora of Peru
Flora of Southeast Brazil
Flora of southern South America